The Outlaw is a 1943 American Western film, directed by Howard Hughes and starring Jack Buetel, Jane Russell, Thomas Mitchell, and Walter Huston. Hughes also produced the film, while Howard Hawks served as an uncredited co-director. The film is notable as Russell's breakthrough role, and she became regarded as a sex symbol and a Hollywood icon. Later advertising billed Russell as the sole star. The Outlaw and The Ox-Bow Incident (released later in 1943) are the earliest films in the AllMovie list of psychological Westerns.

Plot
Sheriff Pat Garrett welcomes his old friend Doc Holliday to Lincoln, New Mexico. Doc is looking for his stolen horse and finds it held by Billy the Kid. Despite this, the two gunfighters take a liking to each other, much to Garrett's disgust. Doc still tries to steal his horse back late that night, but Billy is waiting for him outside the barn.

After that, Billy decides to sleep in the barn, and shots are fired at him. He overpowers his ambusher, who turns out to be Rio McDonald, Doc's love-interest. She is out to avenge her dead brother. It is implied that the Kid rapes Rio after ripping off her dress.

The next day, a stranger offers to shoot Garrett in the back while the Kid distracts the lawman. But, he is only setting the Kid up. Billy, suspicious as always, guns down the stranger when he draws on him. There are no witnesses, and Garrett tries to arrest Billy. Garrett does not understand when Doc sides with the Kid. As the pair start to leave, Garrett shoots Billy. Doc in response shoots the gun out of his hand and also shoots and kills two of Garrett's men.

Doc flees with Billy to the home of Rio and her aunt, Guadalupe. With a posse after them, Doc rides away. Instead of killing the unconscious Kid, Rio instead nurses him to health over the next month, and even sleeps with him to keep him warm. By the time Doc returns, Rio has fallen in love with her patient, and claims to have secretly married him. Doc is furious that Billy has stolen his girlfriend. After Doc's anger subsides a bit, the Kid gives him a choice: the horse or Rio. To Billy's annoyance, Doc picks the horse. Angered that both men value the animal more than her, Rio fills their canteens with sand. The two ride off without noticing.

On the trail, they are pursued by Garrett and a posse. The pair surmise that Rio tipped the sheriff off. Doc kills a few men from long range, but leaves Garrett unharmed.

When Doc wakes one morning, he finds Billy gone and Garrett waiting to handcuff him and take him back to town. Stopping at Rio's, the two men find that Billy has left Rio tied up in sight of water in revenge. Suspecting that Billy loves Rio and will return to free her, Garrett waits. Billy indeed returns, and he is captured.

On the way back to town, they are surrounded by hostile Mescaleros. Garrett reluctantly frees his prisoners and returns their revolvers, after extracting a promise from Doc that he will give them back and make Billy do the same. They manage to elude the Indians, but Doc refuses to honor his word.

As Doc tries to leave with his horse, Billy stops him. The two men decide to have a duel, which Garrett expects Billy to lose. However, as they await the signal (the end of a clock signalling eight o'clock), Billy moves his hands away from his guns. Doc tries to provoke him, inflicting minor wounds in one hand and both ears, but the Kid still will not fire. The two reconcile. Furious, Garrett calls Doc out, despite not having a chance. Doc makes no attempt to shoot his friend and is fatally wounded. Garrett is aghast.

After Doc is buried, Garrett offers to give Billy their friend's revolvers. He also persuades Billy to give him his guns, saying that he can claim that it is Billy in the grave, and Billy can leave his past behind him and have a fresh start in life. But Garrett had removed the firing pins from Doc's revolvers. However, while comparing the guns, Billy had inadvertently switched one of Doc's for his, so neither of the men's guns fire. Billy pulls out a second, working gun. He handcuffs Garrett, judging that the lawman will say that Billy is dead rather than admit that Billy left him helpless. As he is riding away, Billy stops and looks back; Rio joins him on his horse.

Cast

 Jack Buetel as Billy the Kid
 Jane Russell as Rio McDonald
 Thomas Mitchell as Pat Garrett
 Walter Huston as Doc Holliday
 Mimi Aguglia as Guadalupe
 Joe Sawyer as Charley
 Gene Rizzi as stranger who tries to trick Billy
 Dickie Jones as boy (uncredited)
 Edward Peil Sr. as Swanson (uncredited) 
 Lee Shumway as card dealer (uncredited)

Production

In 1941, while filming The Outlaw, Hughes felt that the camera did not do justice to Jane Russell's bust. He employed his engineering skills to design a new cantilevered underwire bra to emphasize her figure. Hughes added curved structural steel rods that were sewn into the brassiere under each breast cup and connected to the bra's shoulder straps. This arrangement allowed the breasts to be pushed upward and the bra shoulder straps to be moved away from the neck, exposing more of her bosom. Contrary to many media reports afterward, Russell did not wear the bra during filming; she said in her 1988 autobiography that the bra was so uncomfortable that she secretly discarded it. She wrote that the "ridiculous" contraption hurt so much that she wore it for only a few minutes, and instead wore her own bra. To prevent Hughes from noticing, Russell padded the cups with tissue and tightened the shoulder straps before returning to the set. She later said "I never wore it in The Outlaw, and he never knew. He wasn’t going to take my clothes off to check if I had it on. I just told him I did." The famed bra ended up in a Hollywood museum—a false witness to the push-up myth.

Although the film was completed in February 1941, Hughes had trouble getting it approved by the Hollywood Production Code Administration due to its emphasis on and display of Russell's breasts. The Production Administration set the standards for morally acceptable content in motion pictures, and ordered cuts to the film. Hughes reluctantly removed about 40 feet, or a half-minute, of footage that prominently featured Russell's bosom. However, 20th Century Fox decided to cancel its agreement to release The Outlaw; as a result, Hughes stood to lose millions of dollars. Ever the resourceful businessman, he schemed to create a public outcry for his film to be banned.

Hughes had his managers call ministers, women's clubs and housewives, informing them about the 'lewd picture' he was about to release. The public responded by protesting and trying to have the film banned, which generated the publicity Hughes needed to establish a demand for the film and get it released. The resulting controversy created enough interest to get The Outlaw into theaters for one week in 1943, and then it was pulled due to violations of the Production Code. The film was released widely on April 23, 1946, when RKO Radio Pictures premiered the film in San Francisco, where it became a box-office hit. By the end of 1946, the film had earned $3 million in domestic rentals. Additional re-releases in 1950 and 1952 brought its lifetime rental earnings to $5.075 million.

Hughes sued Classic Film Museum, Inc. and Alan J. Taylor for unlawful distribution of Hell's Angels, Scarface, and The Outlaw. When it emerged that The Outlaw had fallen into the public domain in 1969 for lack of copyright renewal, the case was settled, with Classic Film Museum agreeing to stop distribution of the two copyrighted titles, and Hughes withdrawing his claim on The Outlaw.

The film was later colorized twice. The first colorization was released by Hal Roach Studios in 1988. The second colorized version, produced by Legend Films, was released to DVD on June 16, 2009, featuring both the newly colorized edition and a restored black-and-white edition of the film. The DVD version also featured an audio commentary by Jane Russell and actress Terry Moore, Hughes's alleged wife. Russell approved of the colorization, stating "The color looked great. It was not too strong, like in many of the early colorized movies that made the films look cheap."

Notes

External links

 
 
 
 
 
 Advertising Blimp "Kept off the screen for 3 years, it's coming at last! The Outlaw starring Jane Russell"

1943 films
1943 Western (genre) films
1940s English-language films
American Western (genre) films
American black-and-white films
Articles containing video clips
Biographical films about Billy the Kid
Cultural depictions of Doc Holliday
Cultural depictions of Pat Garrett
Films directed by Howard Hawks
Films directed by Howard Hughes
Films scored by Victor Young
Films set in New Mexico
Films with screenplays by Jules Furthman
Obscenity controversies in film
RKO Pictures films
Revisionist Western (genre) films
1940s American films